Wallace "Wally" Henry (born October 30, 1954) is a former professional American football wide receiver.  He played in the National Football League for six seasons for the Philadelphia Eagles.  He went to the Pro Bowl after the 1979 season as a kick returner.  Henry attended Lincoln High School in San Diego.  He played college football at the University of California at Los Angeles.

References 

1954 births
Living people
American football return specialists
American football wide receivers
Philadelphia Eagles players
UCLA Bruins football players
National Conference Pro Bowl players
Players of American football from San Diego